Elections to the Labour Party's Shadow Cabinet (more formally, its "Parliamentary Committee") occurred in November 1988. In addition to the 15 members elected, the Leader (Neil Kinnock), Deputy Leader (Roy Hattersley), Labour Chief Whip (Derek Foster), Labour Leader in the House of Lords (Cledwyn Hughes), and Chairman of the Parliamentary Labour Party (Stan Orme) were automatically members.

The 15 winners of the election are listed below:

† Multiple candidates tied for position.

References

1988
1988 elections in the United Kingdom